Bristol Warehouse Historic District is a national historic district located at Bristol, Virginia. The district encompasses five contributing buildings and one contributing structure in a regional rail, shipping and industrial center area of Bristol.  The district contains a former railroad station, four warehouse buildings, and one dwelling. They are the South Atlantic & Ohio Railroad passenger station and offices (c. 1887), Bristol Warehouse Company (c. 1940), Bristol Builders Supply Company (c. 1920), parsonage for the John Wesley United Methodist Church (c. 1940), Central Warehouse building (1946), a commercial building (c. 1950), and the South Atlantic & Ohio Railroad Tracks (c. 1887).

It was listed on the National Register of Historic Places in 2012.

References

Commercial buildings on the National Register of Historic Places in Virginia
National Register of Historic Places in Bristol, Virginia
Buildings and structures in Bristol, Virginia
Historic districts on the National Register of Historic Places in Virginia